Bythitinae is a subfamily of viviparous brotulas, one of the two subfamilies in the family Bythitidae. This subfamily is characterised by having the dorsal, caudal and anal fins combined. They are mostly found in temperate to tropical seas, from reefs to the benthopelagic zone, but some species from the North Atlantic Ocean occur in into Arctic waters.

Genera
The following genera are included in the subfamily Bythininae:

 Acarobythites
 Anacanthobythites
 Bellottia
 Bythites
 Calamopteryx
 Cataetyx
 Diplacanthopoma
 Ematops
 Grammonus
 Hastatobythites
 Hephthocara
 Microbrotula
 Parasaccogaster
 Pseudogilbia
 Pseudonus
 Saccogaster
 Stygnobrotula
 Thalassobathia
 Thermichthys
 Timorichthys
 Tuamotuichthys

References

Bythitidae
Fish subfamilies